David Anthony Burke (born March 28, 2005), known professionally as d4vd (pronounced David), is an American singer and songwriter. He is best known for his song "Romantic Homicide", which peaked at number 33 on the Billboard Hot 100.

Career 
Burke made montage videos of the video game Fortnite and decided to make his own music in order to prevent himself from receiving copyright strikes. Burke has been a long-standing member of the esports organization Team Limit. In September 2022, he released the music video for his song "Romantic Homicide". Burke also released the music video to his second hit single "Here With Me" in November 2022.

Discography

Singles

Notes

References

External links 
 

2005 births
21st-century American rappers
21st-century American singers
American child singers
American male singers
Interscope Records artists
Living people
Musicians from Houston